Hugh L. Smith (May 12, 1934 - December 16, 2007) was a reporter, news anchor, and news director at WTVT in Tampa, Florida, from 1963 until his retirement in 1991.  Having worked at WTVT for over 27 years, he is considered a television pioneer, being part of the first live color telecast in Tampa, the first remote broadcast, and the first hour-long newscast.

Early life

Smith was born in Madison, South Dakota and grew up in the small town of Pipestone, Minnesota.  He developed an interest in radio by listening to broadcasters Edward R. Murrow, Eric Sevareid, Douglas Edwards, and Robert Trout.  He earned a journalism degree at the University of Minnesota where he was a member of Phi Sigma Kappa fraternity. Smith graduated in 1956.  He was editor-in-chief of the Minnesota Daily student newspaper during the 1955–56 academic year.

Career 
Smith's broadcast career started as staff writer for WCCO-AM in Minneapolis, Minnesota.  He later went to work at WHAS AM/TV in Louisville, Kentucky, and later went to work at KVTV in Sioux City, Iowa before coming to WTVT in 1963.  He was named assistant news director of WTVT in 1966.  In 1966 he anchored the first color newscast in Tampa.  In 1976 he did their first remote live broadcast while reporting from a helicopter hovering 500 feet over a news scene.  As news director he was instrumental in increasing the duration of WTVT's news coverage slots - first from 15 to 30 minutes, and then to 60 minutes.  He held the dual post of news director and news anchor for 15 years.
He left the station in 1991.  He then substituted in April 1991 for radio station WMTX morning broadcaster Pat Brooks, and joined the WMTX's Mason Dixon morning show as news anchor.
He died in St. Petersburg, Florida on December 16, 2007 from complications from melanoma.

References

External links
Story from WTVT
St. Pete Times story
big13.net: Profile of Smith

2007 deaths
Television anchors from Tampa, Florida
Deaths from melanoma
People from Madison, South Dakota
University of Minnesota School of Journalism and Mass Communication alumni
1934 births
Deaths from cancer in Florida
Journalists from South Dakota
People from Pipestone, Minnesota
20th-century American journalists
American male journalists